George Beare (died 1749), was an English painter.

Biography
Little is known of his life, but according to the RKD he worked in London, Chichester and Salisbury.	
He is known for portraits and engravings and died in Wiltshire.

External links 

 Nigel Surrey archive at the Paul Mellon Centre; research papers on the work of George Beare

References
	
	
George Beare on Artnet	
	

1749 deaths
People from Salisbury
Year of birth missing
18th-century English painters
English male painters
18th-century English male artists